Vadavali is a village in Mawal taluka of Pune district in the state of Maharashtra, India.

Administration
The village is administered by a sarpanch, an elected representative who leads a gram panchayat. At the time of the 2011 Census of India, the gram panchayat governed four villages and was based at Govitri.

Demographics
At the 2011 census, the village comprised 72 households. The population of 345 was split between 174 males and 171 females.

See also
List of villages in Mawal taluka

References

Villages in Mawal taluka